Castles of Hârn is a 1987 role-playing game supplement for HârnMaster published by Columbia Games.

Contents
Castles of Hârn is a supplement in which the history, economics, and religious situation of eight castles from all over Harn are detailed.

Publication history
Castles of Hârn was written by Edwin King and Richard Porter, with art by Eric Hotz, and was published by Columbia Games in 1988 as a 64-page book.

Shannon Appelcline noted that "This was the golden age of Hârn, roughly from 1983, when Cities of Hârn was produced to 1987, when Columbia completed their coverage of the core Hârn kingdoms and started producing standalone books like Son of Cities (1987) and Castles of Hârn (1987)."

Reception
Jake Thornton reviewed Castles of Harn for Games International magazine, and gave it 2 stars out of 5, and stated that "I would suggest spending the money instead on one of the excellent texts on real mediaeval fortifications. The only people that I can recommend this to are confirmed Harn addicts who probably have it already."

Other reviews and commentary
White Wolf #40 (1994)

References

Hârn supplements
Role-playing game supplements introduced in 1987